The Embassy of the Republic of Indonesia in Washington, D.C. is the diplomatic mission of the Republic of Indonesia to the United States. 
It is located at 2020 Massachusetts Avenue, Northwest, Washington, D.C., in the Embassy Row neighborhood. Indonesia has five consulate generals in Chicago, Houston, Los Angeles, New York City, and San Francisco, and an honorary consulate in Honolulu. There is also a permanent mission to the United Nations in New York.

The current Ambassador is Rosan Roeslani who was appointed by President Joko Widodo on 25 October 2021.

Building
The building is also known as the Walsh-McLean House and is listed on the National Register of Historic Places. It is a contributing property to the Massachusetts Avenue Historic District, as well as the Dupont Circle Historic District.

The 50-room mansion, designed by architect Henry Andersen, was built from 1901 to 1903 by Irish-born Thomas F. Walsh for his daughter Evalyn. It cost $853,000 to construct (about $20 million in 2008). Evalyn eventually married Edward McLean, whose family owned The Washington Post. Edward negotiated to buy his wife the Hope Diamond, in a dressing room of the house. She was the last private owner of the famous jewel.

In 1936, the mansion was used by the U.S. Suburban Resettlement Administration, and in 1937 by the U.S. Rural Electrification Commission.
From 1941 to 1951 the American Red Cross manufactured surgical dressings, and held classes for nurse's aides in the building.

On 19 December 1951, Ali Sastroamidjojo purchased the building for $335,000, for Indonesia.

In September 2014, the Indonesian government inaugurated a 16-foot tall statue of Dewi Saraswati, a goddess of knowledge and wisdom, representative of the island of Bali. This statue is one of a few that graces Embassy Row, the others being a statue of Winston Churchill at the British Embassy, as well as a statue of Mahatma Gandhi at the Indian Embassy.

See also
 Embassy of Indonesia, Ottawa
 Consulate-General of Indonesia, Houston

Gallery

References

External links

 
 
 
 
 
 
 
 "A Golden Era", Washington Life, 1 April 2006
 Official website
 wikimapia

Indonesia
Washington, D.C.
Houses on the National Register of Historic Places in Washington, D.C.
Indonesia–United States relations
Indonesia
Houses completed in 1903
Indonesia